Paul Tucker may refer to:
 Paul Hayes Tucker (born 1950), American art historian, professor, curator, and author
 Sir Paul Tucker (banker) (born 1958), British banker
 Paul Tucker (musician) (born 1965), British musician, creator and member of the band Lighthouse Family
 Paul Tucker (athlete) (born 1976), Guyanese Olympic hurdler
 Paul Tucker (artist) (born 1981), Canadian comic book artist
 Paul Tucker (politician), American politician, member of the Massachusetts House of Representatives